The Queen's Knight Defense (also known as the Nimzowitsch Queen Pawn Defence, Bogoljubov–Mikenas Defense or Lundin Defense) is a chess opening defined by the moves:

1. d4 Nc6

Unless the game transposes to another opening, the Encyclopedia of Chess Openings code for the Queen's Knight Defense is A40.

Discussion
This opening was tried by some hypermodern players such as Aron Nimzowitsch and Efim Bogoljubov, but it has never become very popular. The move 1...Nc6 is a fairly committal move which blocks Black's c-pawn; usually Black delays playing it until White's setup is clear.

Most games featuring 1.d4 Nc6 transpose to another opening. After 2.e4 the Nimzowitsch Defense arises. After 2.Nf3 d5 a variation of the Queen's Pawn Game is possible. After 2.c4 d5 the opening is a Chigorin Defense.

There are some lines which are unique to 1.d4 Nc6, most importantly 2.d5 which chases the knight away, usually to e5. The opening resembles an Alekhine's Defence but on the opposite side of the board. In an opening book by Sid Pickard, this variation was called the Bozo–Indian Defense – "Bozo" being a combination of the prefixes "Nimzo" and "Bogo".

The Queen's Knight Defense was featured (although not mentioned by name) in the season four episode of Chuck entitled "Chuck Versus the Family Volkoff".

Variations 
 2.d5 Nb8 (Montevideo Retreat)
 2.c4 e5 3.d5 Nd4 (Cannstatter Variation)
 2.c4 e5 3.d5 Nce7 (Lithuanian Variation)
 2.d5 Ne5 3.e4 e6 4.f4 exd5 5.fxe5 Qh4+ (Full Metal Jacket Variation)
 2.c4 e5 3.dxe5 Nxe5 4.Nc3 Nxc4 (Pozarek Gambit)

Transpositions
After 1. d4 Nc6 Black should be ready for various variations. However, White cannot just ignore the fact that his opponent is ready to play e5 in the next move. Therefore, practically speaking, white is more likely to limit himself to the move 2. Nf3 trying to reach a position where he has the theory advantage. Black could respond to Nf3 with 2 main moves:

I - 2. Nf3 d6 can transpose to the Pirc defense ( if black successfully play the move d6 and g6. White must play e4 and go into open games theory ) or the King's Indian Defence if White plays the early c4 and go into the closed games theory.

II - 2. Nf3 e6 can transpose to the Nimzo-Indian Defence, Bogo-Indian Defence and the Chigorin Defense if white plays c4 immediately. If white tries going for an open game, the game can transpose to a Guimard French or some individual French Defense with 4. ... e5 or the Nimzowitsch Defence.

III - Unusual Sequences:

Dutch Defence - 1.d4 Nc6 2.Nf3 d6 3.g3 g6 4.Bg2 Bg7 5.0-0 f5 6.d5

Ruy Lopez - 1.d4 Nc6 2.Nf3 d6 3.e4 e5 4.Bb5 exd4 5.Qxd4

Illustrative games
Erich Weinitschke vs. Efim Bogoljubov, Bad Elster (Germany) 1938: 

Analysis by Sid Pickard:

"An splendid example of dynamism concealed in Black opening:1. d4 Nc6 2. d5 Ne5 3. f4 Ng6 4. e4 e5 (this position more commonly occurs from the Nimzowitsch Defense by 1.e4 Nc6 2.d4 e5 3.d5 Nce7 4.f4 Ng6) 5. f5 '(more cautious would be 5. dxe6, though after fxe6 Black has the open f-file as a base for counter-attack)' Qh4+ 6. Kd2 Qxe4 7. fxg6 Qxd5+ 8. Ke1 Qxd1+ 9. Kxd1 hxg6 10. Nc3 c6 11. Nf3 f6 12. Bd3 '(storing up trouble. White's minor pieces become potentially exposed to Black's advancing pawns. In order to make a game of it White had to play 12.Be2)' Ne7 13. Re1 d5 '(Black's opening sacrifice has been a complete success. He controls the center and his three pawns outweighs White's extrapiece, but this is a somewhat forlorn gesture.)' 14. h3 e4 15. Bxe4 dxe4 16. Nxe4 Kf7 17. Bd2 Nf5 18. b3 g5 19. Ke2 Nd6 20. Nf2 Bf5 21. Nd4 Bg6 22. Kf1 Nf5 23. Ne2 Bc5 24. Ne4 Bb6 '(Black's task is easy. He has an extra pawn, two bishops and better development)' 25. c4 Rad8 26. Red1 Rxd2 27. Nxd2 Ne3+ 

'(White resigned in the favor of 28. Ke1 Nxg2+ 29. Kf1 Ne3+ 30. Ke1 Rxh3)'"

Notes

References 

 
 
 
Chess openings